Ponerorchis is a genus of Asian terrestrial tuberous orchids (family Orchidaceae). It is native to temperate Eurasia, from Poland to Japan, to the north of the Indian subcontinent and to northern Indochina.

They can be found in evergreen forests and meadows in temperate, mountainous regions. The species  Ponerorchis chidorii, endemic to Japan, is also known to grow epiphytically.

In the horticultural trade, this genus is abbreviated as "Pnr". A wide range of mostly cultivars of Ponerorchis graminifolia are in cultivation, but are rarely grown outside Japan.

Description
Ponerorchis species grow from an ovoid tuber. They are slender plants with one to three usually slightly fleshy leaves. The flowers are all borne on the same side of the stem. The upper sepal and the two lateral petals form a hood. The column is short and has obvious side appendages. There is a rostellum separating the pollinia from the stigma.

The genus was substantially expanded in 2014, so older descriptions do not necessarily apply to the revised genus. Ponerorchis was said to be differentiated from Amitostigma and Neottianthe by the presence of a bursicle or "sac" around the viscidium (a sticky pad at the base of the pollinium). However, this feature was found to be present in some species formerly assigned to Amitostigma and to be difficult to detect in some species of Ponerorchis. In the expanded genus, a bursicle is present is some species and not in others.

Taxonomy

Phylogeny and classification
The genus Ponerorchis was erected by Heinrich Gustav Reichenbach in 1852 for the species Ponerorchis graminifolia. Phylogenetic studies between 1997 and 2003 showed that Ponerorchis, when broadly defined, formed a clade with the genera Amitostigma, Neottianthe and Hemipilia. Ponerorchis, as then circumscribed, was not monophyletic. In 2003, in advance of further studies involving more species, Ponerorchis was broadened to include Chusua, and an "orphan" species was transferred from Ponerorchis to become Hemipilia brevicalcarata. A more detailed molecular phylogenetic study in 2014 confirmed the strong relationship between Amitostigma, Neottianthe and Ponerorchis, whose species were mixed together in a single clade, making none of the three genera monophyletic as then circumscribed. Amitostigma and Neottianthe were subsumed into Ponerorchis, making it a considerably larger genus.

Ponerorchis was previously distinguished from related genera by the presence of bursicles (pouchlike receptacles) enclosing the pollinia. The presence or absence of a bursicle was found not to be a useful diagnostic character, having arisen independently at least four times in the Orchideae.

Ponerorchis is placed in the orchid subfamily Orchidoideae, tribe Orchideae, subtribe Orchidineae. After the genera were re-circumscribed as explained above, the relationship between Ponerorchis and the rest of the subtribe is as shown in the cladogram below.

Species
Species accepted as of March 2018:

 Ponerorchis alpestris (Fukuy.) X.H.Jin, Schuit. & W.T.Jin – N. & Central Taiwan
 Ponerorchis amplexifolia (Tang & F.T.Wang) X.H.Jin, Schuit. & W.T.Jin – China (W. Sichuan)
 Ponerorchis basifoliata (Finet) X.H.Jin, Schuit. & W.T.Jin – China (S.E. Sichuan, N. Yunnan)
 Ponerorchis bidupensis (Aver.) X.H.Jin, Schuit. & W.T.Jin – S. Vietnam
 Ponerorchis bifoliata (Tang & F.T.Wang) X.H.Jin, Schuit. & W.T.Jin – China (N. Sichuan, S. Gansu)
 Ponerorchis brevicalcarata (Finet) Soó – China (S.W. Sichuan to N.W. Yunnan)
 Ponerorchis camptoceras (Rolfe ex Hemsl.) X.H.Jin, Schuit. & W.T.Jin – China (W. & S.W. Sichuan)
 Ponerorchis capitata (Tang & F.T.Wang) X.H.Jin, Schuit. & W.T.Jin – China (Sichuan, W. Hubei)
 Ponerorchis chidorii (Makino) Ohwi – Japan
 Ponerorchis chusua (D.Don) Soó – Siberia to Himalaya
 Ponerorchis compacta (Schltr.) X.H.Jin, Schuit. & W.T.Jin – China (W. Sichuan)
 Ponerorchis crenulata Soó – China (N.W. Yunnan)
 Ponerorchis cucullata (L.) X.H.Jin, Schuit. & W.T.Jin – Poland to Japan and Himalaya
 Ponerorchis dolichocentra (Tang, F.T.Wang & K.Y.Lang) X.H.Jin, Schuit. & W.T.Jin – China (W. Sichuan)
 Ponerorchis exilis (Ames & Schltr.) S.C.Chen – China (Central & N.E. Yunnan)
 Ponerorchis faberi (Rolfe) X.H.Jin, Schuit. & W.T.Jin – China (Sichuan, N.W. Yunnan, N.E. Guizhou)
 Ponerorchis farreri (Schltr.) X.H.Jin, Schuit. & W.T.Jin – S.E. Tibet to China (N.W. Yunnan)
 Ponerorchis fujisanensis (K.Inoue) J.M.H.Shaw – N. & Central Japan
 Ponerorchis gonggashanica (K.Y.Lang) X.H.Jin, Schuit. & W.T.Jin – China (S.W. Sichuan)
 Ponerorchis gracilis (Blume) X.H.Jin, Schuit. & W.T.Jin – China to Temp. E. Asia
 Ponerorchis graminifolia Rchb.f. – Korea, S. Central & S. Japan
 Ponerorchis hemipilioides (Finet) Soó – China (N.W. Yunnan, Central Guizhou)
 Ponerorchis joo-iokiana (Makino) Nakai – N. Korea, Japan (Central Honshu)
 Ponerorchis keiskei (Finet) X.H.Jin, Schuit. & W.T.Jin – Japan (W. Honshu. Shikoku)
 Ponerorchis kinoshitae (Makino) X.H.Jin, Schuit. & W.T.Jin – S. Kuril Islands to Japan (Hokkaido, N. Honshu)
 Ponerorchis kiraishiensis (Hayata) Ohwi – Taiwan
 Ponerorchis lepida (Rchb.f.) X.H.Jin, Schuit. & W.T.Jin – Japan (S. Kyushu) to Central Nansei-shoto
 Ponerorchis limprichtii (Schltr.) Soó – Central China
 Ponerorchis luteola (K.Y.Lang & S.C.Chen) X.H.Jin, Schuit. & W.T.Jin – China (N.W. Yunnan)
 Ponerorchis monantha (Finet) X.H.Jin, Schuit. & W.T.Jin – S.E. Tibet to Central China
 Ponerorchis oblonga (K.Y.Lang) X.H.Jin, Schuit. & W.T.Jin – China (N.W. Yunnan)
 Ponerorchis omeishanica (Tang, F.T.Wang & K.Y.Lang) S.C.Chen – China (Sichuan: Emei Shan)
 Ponerorchis ovata (K.Y.Lang) X.H.Jin, Schuit. & W.T.Jin – China (W. Sichuan)
 Ponerorchis papilionacea (Tang, F.T.Wang & K.Y.Lang) X.H.Jin, Schuit. & W.T.Jin – China (N.W. Sichuan)
 Ponerorchis parceflora (Finet) X.H.Jin, Schuit. & W.T.Jin – China (N.E. Sichuan, Chongqing)
 Ponerorchis pathakiana (Av.Bhattacharjee) J.M.H.Shaw – Arunachal Pradesh
 Ponerorchis physoceras (Schltr.) X.H.Jin, Schuit. & W.T.Jin – China (N.W. & W. Sichuan)
 Ponerorchis puberula (King & Pantl.) Verm. – E. Himalaya
 Ponerorchis pugeensis (K.Y.Lang) S.C.Chen, P.J.Cribb & S.W.Gale – China (S.W. Sichuan)
 Ponerorchis renzii Deva & H.B.Naithani – W. Himalaya
 Ponerorchis secundiflora (Kraenzl.) X.H.Jin, Schuit. & W.T.Jin – Himalaya to China (W. Sichuan, N.W. Yunnan)
 Ponerorchis sichuanica (K.Y.Lang) S.C.Chen, P.J.Cribb & S.W.Gale – China (W. Sichuan)
 Ponerorchis simplex (Tang & F.T.Wang) X.H.Jin, Schuit. & W.T.Jin – China (W. Sichuan, N.W. Yunnan)
 Ponerorchis taiwanensis (Fukuy.) Ohwi – Central & S. Taiwan
 Ponerorchis takasago-montana (Masam.) Ohwi – Central & E. Taiwan
 Ponerorchis tetraloba (Finet) X.H.Jin, Schuit. & W.T.Jin – China (S.W. Sichuan, W. Yunnan)
 Ponerorchis thailandica (Seidenf. & Thaithong) X.H.Jin, Schuit. & W.T.Jin – N. Thailand
 Ponerorchis tibetica (Schltr.) X.H.Jin, Schuit. & W.T.Jin – S.E. Tibet to China (N.W. Yunnan)
 Ponerorchis tominagae (Hayata) H.J.Su & Jr J.Chen – Taiwan
 Ponerorchis trifurcata (Tang, F.T.Wang & K.Y.Lang) X.H.Jin, Schuit. & W.T.Jin – China (N.W. Yunnan)
 Ponerorchis wenshanensis (W.H.Chen, Y.M.Shui & K.Y.Lang) X.H.Jin, Schuit. & W.T.Jin – China (Yunnan)
 Ponerorchis yueana (Tang & F.T.Wang) X.H.Jin, Schuit. & W.T.Jin – S.E. Tibet to China (N.W. Yunnan)

Distribution
Ponerorchis species are widely distributed in Eurasia, mainly in temperate regions, but extending into northern Indo-China. In Europe, they are found in Poland and Eastern Europe. In temperate Asia, they extend from Siberia to the Russian Far East, Mongolia, China and Eastern Asia. They are also found in the north of the Indian subcontinent (the western Himalayas, Nepal, the eastern Himalayas and the Assam region) and in northern Indochina (Myanmar, Thailand and Vietnam).

References

External links 
 
 
 Ponerorchis

 
Orchideae genera
Flora of Poland
Flora of Eastern Europe
Flora of Siberia
Flora of the Russian Far East
Flora of China
Flora of Mongolia
Flora of Eastern Asia
Flora of Assam (region)
Flora of East Himalaya
Flora of Nepal
Flora of West Himalaya
Flora of Myanmar
Flora of Thailand
Flora of Vietnam